Loch Sunart was an iron-hulled sailing ship that was built in Scotland in 1878 for Loch Line's service between Great Britain and Australia. The ship was named after Loch Sunart in Lochaber.

She and wrecked off the coast of Ulster in 1879, but without loss of life.

Building
A. & J. Inglis built Loch Sunart at Pointhouse in Lanarkshire as yard number 135. She was launched on 19 January 1878. She had three masts and was a full-rigged ship.

Loch Sunarts principal owner was James Aitken, a member of one of the families that owned the Loch Line. Her manager was the General Shipping Company, which was part of Loch Line. She was registered in Glasgow. Her UK official number was 78578 and her code letters were RDVK.

Career
In 1878 Loch Sunart made one voyage to Australia and back.

In January 1879 she left Glasgow for Melbourne. Her Master was Captain Gavin Weir. She was carrying emigrants as passengers, and a cargo of spirits, linen, iron railings, coal, machinery, and gunpowder. On 13 January she grounded on Skullmartin Rock in Ballywalter Bay, on the coast of the Ards Peninsula, County Down.

All of Loch Sunarts 45 passengers and 32 crew were rescued. They included apprentice Thomas Pearce, who had survived the wreck of  only seven months earlier. Most of her cargo was salved. tugs failed to free the ship, and on 18 February she was given up as a total loss.

References

Bibliography

1878 ships
History of County Down
Maritime incidents in 1879
Ships built on the River Clyde
Ships sunk with no fatalities
Shipwrecks of Northern Ireland
Victorian-era merchant ships of the United Kingdom